The Château de Vaulogé is a château in Fercé-sur-Sarthe near Le Mans in the Sarthe department of France.

It was built in the 15th century by Jean III de Vaulogé. In the late 18th century,  René-Charles-Joseph de Vahais, a descendant of the original owner, renovated the original castle into a country house.

See also
List of castles in France

External links
Château de Vaulogé official website

Châteaux in Sarthe